The Cultural Properties of Mozambique are protected and promoted in accordance with Law 10/88 of 1988 concerning tangible and intangible properties relating to the cultural heritage of Mozambique (bens materiais e imateriais do património cultural moçambicano). Article 3 defines eight classes of movable cultural properties and four classes of immovable cultural properties: monuments (monumentos), groups of buildings (conjuntos os grupos de edifícios), sites (locais ou sitios), and natural elements (elementos naturais); those classed as património cultural are of exceptional significance and are afforded special state protection.

Cultural Patrimony
Cultural properties classed as património cultural include the following:

See also
 History of Mozambique
 Culture of Mozambique
 List of heritage registers
 UNESCO General History of Africa

References

External links
  Select cultural properties
  Select historic sites
  Museums of Mozambique
  Pedro Guedes (2010). Iron in building, 1750 - 1855: Innovation and cultural resistance PhD Thesis, School of History, Philosophy, Religion Classics, The University of Queensland.

Mozambican culture
Heritage registers in Mozambique